The Roy Rogers and Dale Evans Show is a Western comedy and variety program that ran on ABC television for 13 episodes from September 29 to December 29, 1962. In addition to Roy Rogers and Dale Evans Rogers, who married in 1947, the program featured members of the Sons of the Pioneers, Pat Brady, and Cliff Arquette in his role of country iconoclast Charley Weaver.

Synopsis
The premiere episode "Seattle World's Fair" honored the celebration in 1962 in Seattle, Washington. The November 3 episode was set at Knotts Berry Farm amusement park in Buena Park, California. Martha Raye guest-starred in the December 8 episode "Circus". Dale Robertson of NBC's Tales of Wells Fargo appeared in the episode "Western Hit Parade" on October 20, which offered the songs "Cool Water", "Do Not Forsake Me, Oh My Darling", and "Don't Fence Me In". Still another segment featured singer Kathy Taylor and magician Mark Wilson.

A patriotic program was broadcast on October 27. A tribute to silent film star William S. Hart aired on November 10. A Thanksgiving Day celebration aired on November 17, and a Grand National horse show followed on November 24. A minstrel show was presented on December 1.
The last new episode entitled "Christmas Open House" aired on December 22.

From 1951 to 1957, the couple had a successful half-hour western drama The Roy Rogers Show, which aired for 104 episodes on Sunday afternoons on NBC. It was rebroadcast on Saturday mornings on CBS from 1961 to 1964. Evans herself composed the words and music of the program theme song, Happy Trails. The song quickly became the composition most associated with the pair.

Demise
The series was quickly canceled. The program preceded another short-lived ABC series, the sitcom Mr. Smith Goes to Washington, starring Fess Parker and Red Foley. Roy and Dale aired opposite the first year of The Jackie Gleason Show, another comedy-variety program, on CBS. NBC ran the legal drama Sam Benedict at that hour, co-starring Edmond O'Brien in the title role, with Richard Rust as his understudy.

Post honours for stars
The Handbook of Texas described the 1962 variety program as an unsuccessful attempt by Rogers and Evans to "revive their flagging popularity". The couple retired to Apple Valley in San Bernardino County, California, and devoted themselves to their Roy Rogers and Dale Evans Museum, which was moved thereafter to nearby Victorville, California, and then to Branson, Missouri. Evans continued to write books testifying to her Christian faith and appeared at numerous spiritual conferences. The Texas Press Association named her "Texan of the Year" in 1970. She was named in 1995 to the National Cowgirl Museum and Hall of Fame. She and Rogers were elected to the Western Music Association Hall of Fame in 1989.

References

External links 
 

1962 American television series debuts
1962 American television series endings
American Broadcasting Company original programming
1960s Western (genre) television series
1960s American variety television series
Television shows set in California
Black-and-white American television shows
1960s American comedy television series
Roy Rogers